Ergy or Erzsy Landau (1896–1967) was a Hungarian-French humanist photographer.

Born in Budapest, Landau worked in Franz Xaver Setzer's Vienna studio and then in Rudolf Dührkoop's studio in Berlin. She had photographed the German writer Thomas Mann and her painter/photographer friend, László Moholy-Nagy, whom she introduced to the medium. In May 1922 she emigrated to Paris, where she established herself as a portrait photographer. Landau brought the first Rolleiflex to France. Nora Dumas joined Landau's studio in 1929, and Ylla in 1932.

Landau met Charles Rado in 1933. Rado founded the photo press agency Rapho with Landau, Ylla, Brassaï, and Nora Dumas, but was forced to close the agency during World War II.
Landau had met  on holiday in 1930, and introduced him to the other Hungarian photographers in Paris. After World War II Landau encouraged Grosset to restart Rapho.

Landau died in Paris.

Book 
Landau, Ergy (1955). Aujourd'hui la Chine. Lausanne: La Guilde du Livre.

References

External links
Ergy Landau Pictures and Images

1896 births
1967 deaths
Photographers from Budapest
French photographers
Hungarian women photographers
Hungarian photographers
Hungarian emigrants to France
20th-century women photographers
French women photographers